Korbevac is a village in the municipality of Vranje, in southern Serbia. According to the 2002 census, the village has a population of 711 people.

References

Populated places in Pčinja District